Anthony George Want (born 13 December 1948) is an English former professional footballer who played as a defender. He played more than 150 games in the First Division of the Football League for Tottenham Hotspur and Birmingham City, and spent time on loan to the Philadelphia Atoms of the North American Soccer League (NASL) in 1975, before continuing his NASL career in 1978 with Minnesota Kicks.

Honours
Philadelphia Atoms
 NASL All-star Second Team 1975

References

Living people
1948 births
Footballers from the London Borough of Hackney
English footballers
Association football defenders
Tottenham Hotspur F.C. players
Birmingham City F.C. players
Philadelphia Atoms players
Minnesota Kicks players
English Football League players
North American Soccer League (1968–1984) players
North American Soccer League (1968–1984) indoor players
English expatriate sportspeople in the United States
Expatriate soccer players in the United States
English expatriate footballers